The women's 3m springboard event at the 1984 Summer Olympics was held 5–6 August 1984, at Olympic Swim Stadium in Los Angeles, USA. It was one of four diving events on the Games.

The competition was split into two phases:

Preliminary round (5 August)
Divers performed ten dives. The twelve divers with the highest scores advanced to the final.
Final (6 August)
Divers performed another set of ten dives and the score here obtained determined the final ranking.

Results

References

Women
1984
1984 in women's diving
Div